Grube Düppenweiler is a museum in Saarland, Germany.

External links
www.beckingen.de

Museums in Saarland
Show mines